Jean-Jacques Grand-Jouan (5 October 1949 – 27 October 2020) was a French film actor, director, producer, and screenwriter. In 1974, he became a resident of the French Academy in Rome, where he was the first filmmaker.

Actor

Cinema
Solveig et le violon turc (1977)
Un bruit qui court (1983)
Thank You Satan (1989)

Television
Deuil en vingt-quatre heures (1982)
De bien étranges affaires (1982)
Série noire (1986)
Julien Fontanes, magistrat (1988)
Les Lutteurs immobiles (1988)
Navarro (1993)
L'Empire du Tigre : fumeur d'opium (2005)

Producer
Rue du Pied de Grue (1979)

Director
Solveig et le violon turc (1977)
Rue du Pied de Grue (1979)
Debout les crabes, la mer monte ! (1983)
Lucifer et moi (2009)

Screenwriter
Rue du Pied de Grue (1979)
Debout les crabes, la mer monte ! (1983)

Theatre
Service du nuit at the Théâtre Gramont (1968)

References

1949 births
2020 deaths
20th-century French actors
21st-century French actors
French male film actors
French male television actors
French directors
French screenwriters
Actors from Nantes
Mass media people from Nantes